Major-General Sir Frederick Richard Solly-Flood  (19 March 1829 – 7 April 1909) was a British Army officer who became Commandant of the Royal Military College Sandhurst.

Military career
Solly-Flood was the son of Frederick Solly-Flood (1801-1888) of Ballynaslaney House, County Wexford, the attorney-general of Gibraltar.

He was commissioned into the 53rd Regiment of Foot in 1859. He became a captain in the 82nd Regiment of Foot in 1860 and, having been appointed a Knight Commander of the Order of the Bath in 1877, became Commandant of the Royal Military College Sandhurst in 1884, remaining in that post until 1886. He subsequently commanded a District in Bombay.

He lived at Ballynaslaney House in County Wexford.

Family
In 1863 he married Constance Eliza Frere of Porthmawr, Crickhowell, Breconshire. He was succeeded by his son Arthur.

References

 

1829 births
1909 deaths
Knights Commander of the Order of the Bath
British Army major generals
King's Shropshire Light Infantry officers
Commandants of Sandhurst